William Emes (1729 or 1730–13 March 1803) was an English landscape gardener.

Biography
Details of his early life are not known but in 1756 he was appointed head gardener to Sir Nathaniel Curzon at Kedleston Hall, Derbyshire.  He left this post in 1760 when Robert Adam was given responsibility for the entire management of the grounds.  During his time at Kedleston he had started to alter the earlier formal nature of the park and had constructed the upper lake.  Also during this time he married Mary Innocent, who was his servant and the daughter of a tailor.  Together they had five sons and three daughters. His son John Emes who was born in 1762 was a successful engraver and silversmith.

After leaving Kedleston he moved to live in Bowbridge House, (Not Bowbridge Fields farm as previously thought) Mackworth. This was later the home of Edward Darwin (son of Erasamus Darwin who was William Emes friend through the Lunar Society) where he developed his practice as a landscape designer, which was concentrated mainly in the Midlands and in north Wales.  His style was similar to that of Lancelot 'Capability' Brown.  At Eaton Hall, Cheshire, Emes was called in to replace Brown by Lord Grosvenor. He sometimes furnished a plan and then left the client to undertake the work.  On other occasions he would supervise the work for many years, such as the gardens at Chirk Castle and at Erddig where his involvement continued for 25 years. Emes also designed a few minor buildings. 

The main features of his designs were trees and water. Characteristic designs included serpentine lakes with their ends concealed in woodland, single trees and clumps of trees in parkland with tree belts round the boundary.  He created flower gardens adjacent to the house at Sandon Hall, anticipating the later work of Humphry Repton.

His wife died in 1789 and Emes then moved to Hampshire taking a lease of Elvetham Park from Sir Henry Gough-Calthorpe.  Here he took commissions in the south of England, sometimes in partnership with John Webb, formerly his foreman.  He later moved to London where he died at Vicarage House, St Giles Cripplegate, the home of his daughter, Sarah.  He was buried at St Giles Cripplegate.

Designs

Buildings
Lodge at Attingham Hall, Shropshire
Greenhouse at Penrice Castle, Glamorgan

Gardens
In whole or in part:

Cambridgeshire
Wimpole Hall (walled garden) (1790)
Chippenham (1795)

Cheshire
Tatton Hall (1768)
Crewe Hall (1769)
Oulton Hall (1770)
Peover Hall
Eaton Hall
Cholmondeley Hall (1777)
Arley Hall (c.1760 and then 1787)

Derbyshire
Kedleston (1756–1760)
Calke Abbey (1776)
Markeaton Hall
Shipley Hall
Darley Park
Radbourne Hall (1790)
Locko Hall (1792)

Gloucestershire
Daylesford House
Dodington House (1793)
Fairford Park (1783–87)

Greater Manchester

Platt Hall (1768)
Heaton Hall (1770)

Hampshire
Brockenhurst Park
Dogmersfield Park
Elvetham Hall

Lancashire
Claughton Hall, Garstang

Lincolnshire
Belton House

Norfolk
Holkham Hall

Nottinghamshire
Kirklington Hall (1774)  
Carlton Hall, Carlton in Lindrick (1783)

Shropshire
Walcot Park (c. 1774)
Halston Hall (1770s)
Aston Hall (near Oswestry) (1780)
Badger Hall and Dingle (c. 1780)
Dudmaston Hall
Millichope Park
Oakly Park
Hawkstone Park (lake)
Cheswardine Hall, Chipnall

Staffordshire
Ingestre
Sandon (1767)
Keele Hall (1768–1770)
Oakedge (1771)
Beaudesert House
Cuffnell
Statfold (1777)
Sandon Hall (1781–1782)
Etruria Hall
Betley Court

Wiltshire
Chute
Bowood House

Yorkshire
Cave Castle (1787–1791)

Wales

Chirk Castle, Denbighshire (1764–75)
Erddig, Denbighshire (1768–89)
Llanrhaeadr Hall, Denbighshire (1771)
Hawarden Old Rectory, Flintshire (1774)
Gregynog, Montgomeryshire (1774)
Powis Castle, Montgomeryshire
Penrice Castle, Glamorganshire  
Margam Park, Glamorganshire
Rhiwlas, Montgomeryshire

References

Notes

Bibliography

Further reading

1803 deaths
People from Mackworth
English gardeners
English landscape architects
Year of birth uncertain
People from Hart District
English Landscape Garden designers